Mezhdurechensk is an urban locality (an urban-type settlement) in Udorsky District of the Komi Republic, Russia. As of the 2010 Census, its population was 1,418.

Administrative and municipal status
Within the framework of administrative divisions, the urban-type settlement of Mezhdurechensk, together with one rural locality (the settlement of Selegvozh), is incorporated within Udorsky District as Mezhdurechensk Urban-Type Settlement Administrative Territory (an administrative division of the district). As a municipal division, Mezhdurechensk Urban-Type Settlement Administrative Territory is incorporated within Udorsky Municipal District as Mezhdurechensk Urban Settlement.

References

Notes

Sources

Urban-type settlements in the Komi Republic
Bulgarian communities
